Samuel Tobias Hoskins (born 4 February 1993) is an English professional footballer who plays as an attacking midfielder for  club Northampton Town.

Hoskins was born in Dorchester, Dorset and began his career at Southampton, joining the club as a trainee in 2005; signing his first professional contract six years later. After making his first-team debut for Southampton in August 2011, Hoskins was loaned out to Preston North End three months later, although he made no appearances due to injury. He was loaned out once again in March 2012, signing for Rotherham United of League Two for the remainder of the 2011–12 campaign. Hoskins was loaned out for a third time in January 2013, this time joining League One side Stevenage for the rest of the 2012–13 season. After leaving Southampton in 2013, Hoskins signed for Championship side Yeovil Town on a two-year deal.

Career

Southampton
Hoskins joined Southampton's youth academy from Oakwood Rangers in 2005, progressing through the ranks and becoming a permanent fixture in the club's youth and reserve sides. He was top goalscorer for Southampton's U18 side for two successive seasons, before repeating the feat the following two years at U21 level, despite being out on loan for significant periods during the season. Hoskins signed his first professional contract in April 2011, signing an initial year-long deal with the option of a further year. In August 2011, Hoskins made his first-team debut for Southampton, coming on as a last minute substitute for Guly do Prado in the club's 3–1 victory over Swindon Town in the League Cup.

In November 2011, Hoskins joined League One side Preston North End on an emergency one-month loan deal, alongside fellow Southampton striker Jonathan Forte. Southampton manager Nigel Adkins hoped the loan move would help Hoskins gain valuable first-team experience. However, he picked up an injury during a training session, and returned to his parent club in December 2011 having made no appearances for Preston. A month later, in January 2012, he made one further first-team appearance for Southampton during the 2011–12 campaign, appearing as a 59th-minute substitute as Southampton came from a goal down to win 2–1 at Coventry City in the FA Cup third round.

The coaching staff at Southampton believed a loan move would be beneficial to Hoskins' development, and on 15 March 2012, he joined League Two side Rotherham United on loan until the end of the 2011–12 season, with an option to extend the agreement should Rotherham reach the play-offs. He made his debut two days after joining the club, coming on as a substitute in a 2–1 away defeat to Oxford United. Hoskins scored his first professional goal in April 2012, again appearing as a second-half substitute, and netting an 83rd-minute winner in a 2–1 victory at AFC Wimbledon. He earned his first starting appearance in the penultimate game of the season, scoring with a neat chip in a 2–2 draw against Aldershot Town. During the two-month loan spell, Hoskins made eight appearances, scoring two goals.

Hoskins made two substitute appearances for Southampton at the start of the 2012–13, both in League Cup victories. Meanwhile, he continued to impress in the club's U21 development side, leading the overall goalscoring charts in the division with nine goals in twelve games. In January 2013, Hoskins was loaned out for a third time, this time joining League One side Stevenage, on loan for the remainder of the season. He scored his only goal for Stevenage in the club's 2–0 home win over Notts County on 5 February 2013, scoring within the first minute of the match, from close range after Filipe Morais' shot had deflected into his path. He made 14 appearances for the club during the loan agreement before returning to Southampton at the end of the season.

Hoskins was the top scorer for four consecutive years (twice at U18 level and twice at U21 level) and completed two successful loan spells during his first professional term with Southampton. His goal against Newcastle was voted U21 goal of the season. On 4 June 2013, he was released by Southampton.

Yeovil Town
Hoskins joined newly promoted Championship club Yeovil Town on a two-year deal on 26 June 2013. On 3 August 2013, Hoskins made his debut as a second-half substitute in Yeovil's 1–0 victory over Millwall.

On 19 September 2014, Hoskins joined Conference Premier side Barnet on a short-term loan deal. He made his debut the following day in a 5–0 win over Altrincham, replacing John Akinde, who had already scored a hat-trick, Hoskins scored Barnet's fifth with his first touch to round off the victory. Following the return to fitness of Barnet striker, Charlie MacDonald, Hoskins returned to Yeovil on 27 October 2014 after making seven appearances and scoring twice for Barnet.

On 13 December 2014, Hoskins scored his first Yeovil goal in a 4–0 win over Oldham Athletic.

Hoskins was released by Yeovil at the end of the 2014–15 season following their relegation to League Two.

Northampton Town
On 1 August 2015, Hoskins signed for Northampton Town on a one-year contract. He scored his first league goal for the club in the 1–0 win over Oxford United in Football League Two on 12 September 2015, with his second goal following the week after, away at Morecambe. Hoskins signed a new two and a half year contract on 26 February 2016. Hoskins won the League Two Player of the Month award for August 2022 after scoring five goals during the month.

Career statistics

Honours
Northampton Town
League Two: 2015–16; play-offs: 2020

Individual
EFL League Two Player of the Month: August 2022

References

External links

1993 births
Living people
Sportspeople from Dorchester, Dorset
Footballers from Dorset
English footballers
Association football forwards
Southampton F.C. players
Preston North End F.C. players
Rotherham United F.C. players
Stevenage F.C. players
Yeovil Town F.C. players
Barnet F.C. players
Northampton Town F.C. players
English Football League players
National League (English football) players